FFHG Division 3 (Fédération Française de Hockey sur Glace Division 3 or French Ice Hockey Federation Division 3) is an amateur ice hockey league in France. It is the fourth of four levels of national ice hockey in France.

Teams 
FFHG Division 3 consists of 32 teams divided into four pools with eight teams each.

Season 
Each team plays the other teams in their pool at home and away. At the end of this regular season the 4 highest-ranking teams in each pool enter a combined knock-out play-off series while the four lowest-ranking teams (two from each pool) enter a play-off series of their own. The winner of the former play-off series is promoted to FFHG Division 2.

Champions

External links 
 FFHG Division 3 Official Site 

4